Luis Felipe Urueta Romano (born January 9, 1981) is a Colombian professional baseball coach for the Miami Marlins of Major League Baseball (MLB). He was formerly a first baseman, coach, and manager in Minor League Baseball. He has also coached and managed the Colombia national baseball team in the World Baseball Classic (WBC).

Playing career
Urueta was primarily a first baseman in Minor League Baseball for three seasons. In 2000, he played for the rookie-level Arizona League Diamondbacks, compiling a .235 batting average with three home runs and 27 RBIs in 54 games. In 2002, he played 41 games for the Missoula Osprey in the rookie-level Pioneer League and nine games for the Class A South Bend Silver Hawks; between the two teams, he batted .163 with two home runs and nine RBIs. In 2003, he played four games for the Class A Short Season New Jersey Cardinals and eight games for the Class A-Advanced Palm Beach Cardinals; overall, he batted .100 (3-for-30) with one RBI. In a career total of 116 minor league games, he batted .195 with five home runs and 37 RBIs.

Defensively in the minor leagues, Urueta appeared in 74 games as a first baseman, 12 games as an outfielder, and one game each as a third baseman and as a catcher. He had a .987 fielding percentage at first base.

Also in 2003, Urueta played six games for the Gary SouthShore RailCats of the independent Northern League. He batted .238 (5-for-21) in six games, with one home run and one RBI. He did not play professionally in the United States after 2003.

From 2004 through 2006, Urueta played for Fortitudo Bologna in the Italian Baseball League. He slashed .221/.345/.253 in 2004. In 2005, he batted only .187/.230/.239; he improved in the finals, going 7-for-23 to help his team win it all. After another meek campaign (.205/.317/.270, 1-for-26 in the playoffs) in 2006, he ended his playing career.

Coaching career

Minor leagues
Urueta has been a coach or coordinator in the Diamondbacks' farm system since 2007. He was field coordinator for the Dominican Summer League Diamondbacks in 2011 and a coach for the South Bend Silver Hawks in 2012. He managed the Arizona League Diamondbacks in 2013 and 2014, accruing an overall managerial win–loss record of 58–54 in those two seasons. Urueta was a coach for the Triple-A Reno Aces in 2015.

International
Urueta coached for Colombia in the 2013 World Baseball Classic Qualifiers, then managed the team in the 2017 World Baseball Classic Qualifiers. He guided the team past former WBC teams Panama and Spain to a spot in the 2017 World Baseball Classic, Colombia's first trip to the World Baseball Classic. Following this historic qualification, Urueta's services were also retained to skipper the national team at the WBC.

Urueta served as manager of the Liga Dominicana de Beisbol Profesional team Tigres de Licey.

Major leagues
In October 2017, Urueta was hired as a major league coach for the Arizona Diamondbacks. He became the bench coach for the Diamondbacks in the 2020 season. Urueta became acting manager in a game against the San Diego Padres on July 26, 2020, after Arizona manager Torey Lovullo was ejected in the fifth inning; it was the first time that a person from Colombia managed a team during a major league game.

Personal life
Urueta's nickname is "Pipe" (from Felipe). He is married and has two daughters. As a teenager, Urueta was a football (soccer) goalkeeper; he was inspired to pursue a baseball career after watching Édgar Rentería's game-winning hit in Game 7 of the 1997 World Series.

References

Further reading

External links
, or The Baseball Cube

1981 births
Living people
Sportspeople from Barranquilla
Colombian expatriate baseball players in the United States
Arizona Diamondbacks coaches
Major League Baseball bench coaches
Arizona League Diamondbacks players
Missoula Osprey players
South Bend Silver Hawks players
Gary SouthShore RailCats players
Palm Beach Cardinals players
New Jersey Cardinals players
Fortitudo Baseball Bologna players
Expatriate baseball players in Italy
Colombian expatriate sportspeople in Italy
Colombian expatriate baseball people in the Dominican Republic